Doug Brown may refer to: 
Doug Brown (Australian footballer) (1923–2012), Australian rules footballer in the Victorian Football League
Doug Brown (gridiron football) (born 1974), American retired football player in the NFL and the CFL
Doug Brown (ice hockey) (born 1964), American ice hockey player in the National Hockey League
Doug Brown (runner) (born 1952), American Olympic distance runner
Doug Brown (sportscaster), American sports reporter for ESPN Radio
Dougie Brown (born 1969), Scottish cricketer
Douglas Brown (cricketer) (born 1972), Jamaican-born cricketer for the Turks and Caicos Islands
Douglas Clifton Brown, 1st Viscount Ruffside (1879–1958), British politician
Douglas M. Brown, 28th New Mexico State Treasurer
Douglas Walkden-Brown (1921–2013), Australia-born Fijian politician
Duggie Brown (footballer), association footballer active in Scotland and Australia
H. Douglas Brown (born 1941), American professor of English as a second language
L. Douglas Brown (1907–1964), Canadian Anglican priest
Bryan D. Brown (born 1948), known as Doug, American Army general